"Party Monster" is a song by Canadian singer the Weeknd, from his third studio album Starboy (2016). The song was released for digital download on November 18, 2016, alongside "I Feel It Coming" featuring French electronic duo Daft Punk, as promotional singles. It was later sent to US urban contemporary radio on December 6, 2016, as the album's third single. The song was written and produced by the Weeknd, Ben Billions, and Doc McKinney, with additional writing credits going to Belly and Lana Del Rey, the latter of which providing background vocals.

Composition
"Party Monster" is a trap song written in the key of E minor in common time with a tempo of 77 beats per minute.  The song follows a chord progression of Em–D–C–D.

Commercial performance
"Party Monster" peaked at number 16 on the US Billboard Hot 100 and charted for a total of 19 weeks on the chart, where it was the third-highest peaking track from Starboy. It reached the top ten on both the R&B Songs chart and Hot R&B/Hip-Hop Songs chart. The song also charted and peaked at number 8 on the Canadian Hot 100, where it became the second-highest peaking track in the country from its parent album and charted for 20 weeks. The single was certified 3× Platinum by the Recording Industry Association of America (RIAA) for combined sales and streaming equivalent units of over three million units in the United States in 2022.

Music video
The music video for "Party Monster" premiered on January 12, 2017, and was directed by BRTHR. Rap-Up magazine described its synopsis: "[it] starts with Abel Tesfaye [The Weeknd] behind the wheel, driving through the desert before psychedelics hit and everything gets blurry. With religious and sensual imagery flashing quickly, The Weeknd is transported into a nightmare-like neon and fire-filled world where zombies make out while eating an eyeball cake. As the explosive (sic) clip resumes, it ties into previous visuals like "Starboy" and Abel's Mania vignettes, particularly with the neon cross and panther imagery. In one scene, said panther jumps out of a television screen, causing The Weeknd to sink into his bed. As faces continue to melt around him near the end of the video, he's back on the road. Recklessly, he drives at lightning quick speed, before watching a car drive off a cliff". BRTHR directed Travis Scott's "goosebumps" in a similar style. The cars used in the music video were a Mazda RX-7 FC3S and a Lamborghini Murcielago. Japanese singer and internet personality Joji is credited as the VHS camera operator for the music video.

Use in media
The song was featured in the seventh episode of season two (titled "Bruce Wayne") of the DC web television series Titans.

Remix
A remix of the song was released on January 19, 2017, in collaboration with GQ magazine. The music video for the remix was directed by David Helman and came out simultaneously with the new version of the song dubbed "Party Monster 2.0".

Charts

Weekly charts

Year-end charts

Certifications

Release history

Notes

References

2016 songs
2016 singles
The Weeknd songs
Songs written by the Weeknd
Songs written by Lana Del Rey
Songs written by Ben Billions
Songs written by Doc McKinney
Songs written by Belly (rapper)
Song recordings produced by the Weeknd
Republic Records singles
XO (record label) singles
Songs about casual sex
Trap music songs